The 1899 West Virginia Mountaineers football team was an American football team that represented West Virginia University as an independent during the 1899 college football season. In its first season under head coach Lewis Yeager, the team compiled a 2–3 record and was outscored by a total of 78 to 28. A. C. Chapman was the team captain.

Schedule

References

West Virginia
West Virginia Mountaineers football seasons
West Virginia Mountaineers football